The 1977 Trans-Am Series was the twelfth running of the Sports Car Club of America's premier series. Porsche swept the season. All races except for the Six Hours of Watkins Glen ran for approximately one hundred miles. With the revival of the Can Am Series that year, 1977 also began a resurgence of interest in SCCA events. Trans Am would contribute with a slight resurgence in the eighties.

Results

‡ - The Watkins Glen 6 Hours was a round of the World Championship for Makes. The overall winner was an FIA Group 5 Porsche 935.

Championships

Drivers

Category I
Bob Tullius – 170 points
John Bauer – 162 points
Tom Spalding – 125 points
John Wood – 80 points
Brian Fuerstenau – 60 points
Michael Oleyar – 60 points

Category II
Peter Gregg – 185 points
Ludwig Heimrath – 162 points
Monte Sheldon – 97 points
Hal Shaw, Jr. – 67 points
Greg Pickett – 65 points

Manufacturers

Category I
Porsche – 76 points
British Leyland – 74 points
Chevrolet – 69 points
Ford – 2 points

Category II
Porsche – 117 points
Chevrolet – 33 points

Under 2.5 Liter
Porsche – 61 points
Mazda – 24 points
Ford – 17 points
Datsun – 10 points
Lancia – 5 points
Renault – 5 points

References

Trans-Am Series
Trans-Am